Sybaris yakkala, is a species of blister beetle endemic to Sri Lanka.

Description
Body length is about 10.3 to 13.7 mm. Head with coarse deep and moderately dense punctures. Eyes are moderately large. Pronotum with coarse, deep and moderately dense punctures. Elytra brownish with a black band found at the apex. Legs are black except femora base. Ventrum brown and covered with short dense pubescence. Male has moderately deeply emarginate sixth visible abdominal sternum, in which female is feebly emarginate.

References 

Meloidae
Insects of Sri Lanka
Insects described in 1979